Greece competed at the 1920 Summer Olympics in Antwerp, Belgium. 47 competitors, all men, took part in 34 events in 8 sports. Greek athletes have competed in every Summer Olympic Games.

Medalists

Aquatics

Water polo

Greece competed in the Olympic water polo tournament for the first time in 1920. The Bergvall System was in use at the time. Greece was shut out by the United States in the quarterfinals. It is unclear why the Greeks received a place in the third-place tournament, as the Americans had not won either gold or silver, but Greece beat Italy in the quarterfinals of the bronze medal tournament before losing again to the United States in the bronze semifinals.

 Quarterfinals

 Bronze medal quarterfinals

 Bronze medal semifinals

 Final rank 5th

Athletics

Nine athletes represented Greece in 1920. It was the nation's sixth appearance in athletics, having competed in the sport at every Olympics. The Stockholm Games were only the second time that no Greek won a medal in athletics.

Ranks given are within the heat.

Fencing

Three fencers represented Greece in 1920. It was the nation's third appearance in the sport.

Ranks given are within the group.

Football

Greece competed in the Olympic football tournament for the first time. The country was defeated in the first round by Sweden.

 Team Roster
Ioannis Andrianopoulos
Theodoros Dimitriou
Antonios Fotiadis
Agamemnon Gilis 
Dimitrios Gotis 
Georgios Kalafatis
Nikolaos Kaloudis
Georgios Khatziandreou
Apostolos Nikolaidis
Theodoros Nikolaidis
Khristos Peppas
Reserve:Dimitris Demertzis 
Reserve:Ioannis Stavropoulos 
Reserve:Vassilis Samios  
Reserve:Sotiris Despotopoulos   
Reserve:Georgio Andrianopoulos

 First round

Final rank 10th

Shooting

Nine shooters represented Greece in 1920. It was the nation's fourth appearance in the sport. Greece took a silver medal in the team military pistol, its first medal in shooting since 1896.

Tennis

A single tennis player, in the men's singles, competed for Greece in 1920. It was the nation's second appearance in the sport, and first since 1896. Zerlentis lost his first match, though that single match took 66 games over 4 sets to complete.

Weightlifting

A single weightlifter represented Greece in 1920. It was the nation's third appearance in the sport, in which Greece was the only country to have competed at both prior appearances in 1896 and 1900.

Wrestling

Five wrestlers competed for Greece in 1920. It was the nation's third appearance in the sport. Notaris was the only one to win a match. Both Dialetis and Vergos competed in both freestyle and Greco-Roman.

Freestyle

Greco-Roman

References

External links
 
 
International Olympic Committee results database

Nations at the 1920 Summer Olympics
1920
Olympics